Pushpagiri Medical College Hospital is a 900-bed, multidisciplinary, specialty hospital in Thiruvalla, Kerala, India. It is administered by Thiruvalla Archeparchy of the Syro-Malankara Catholic Church. The hospital began as an eight-bed clinic in 1959 and was recognized as a teaching hospital in 2002. The hospital is certified by the International Organization for Standardization's (ISO) 9001:2000 standards and India's National Accreditation Board for Hospitals & Healthcare Providers (NABH). The hospital has 42 Departments, including Anesthesiology, Critical Care, Dentistry, Dermatology, Emergency Medicine, ENT, General Medicine, General Surgery, Obstetrics & Gynecology, Ophthalmology, Orthopedics, Pediatrics, Physical Medicine and Rehabilitation, Psychiatry, Pulmonary Medicine, and Radio Diagnosis.

The institutions that use Pushpagiri Hospital include:

 Pushpagiri College of Medicine (Pushpagiri Institute of Medical Sciences and Research Centre)
 Pushpagiri College of Pharmacy
 Pushpagiri College of Nursing
 Pushpagiri College of Dental Sciences
 Pushpagiri College of Allied Health Sciences
The hospital's facilities include a 24-hour Adoration Chapel, the Pushpagiri Church and Shrines, a canteen, and hostels.

References

External links 

Main Website
Institute website
Syro-Malankara Catholic Church

Catholic universities and colleges in India
Private medical colleges in India
Hospitals in Kerala
Medical colleges in Kerala
Colleges affiliated with the Kerala University of Health Sciences
Universities and colleges in Pathanamthitta district
Hospitals established in 1959
Educational institutions established in 1959
1959 establishments in Kerala
Thiruvalla
Pathanamthitta
Syro-Malankara Catholic Church